Manseng may refer to several wine grape varieties from South West France:

 Gros Manseng ("large manseng"), white grape
 Manseng Noir ("black manseng"), red grape
 Petit Manseng ("small manseng"), white grape